William McClure (born 20 May 1883, date of death unknown) was a British sports shooter. He competed in three events at the 1912 Summer Olympics.

References

1883 births
Year of death missing
British male sport shooters
Olympic shooters of Great Britain
Shooters at the 1912 Summer Olympics
People from Natal